A tradesman is a skilled worker that specializes in a particular trade (occupation or field of work). Tradesmen usually have work experience, on-the-job training, an apprenticeship program or formal education.

As opposed to a craftsman or an artisan, the occupation of a tradesman is not necessarily restricted to manual work.

History
In Victorian England:
The terms "skilled worker," "craftsman," "artisan," and "tradesman" were used in senses that overlap. All describe people with specialized training in the skills needed for a particular kind of work. Some of them produced goods that they sold from their own premises (e.g. bootmakers, saddlers, hatmakers, jewelers, glassblowers); others (e.g. typesetters, bookbinders, wheelwrights) were employed to do one part of the production in a business that required a variety of skilled workers. Still others were factory hands who had become experts in some complex part of the process and could command high wages and steady employment. Skilled workers in the building trades (e.g. carpenters, masons, plumbers, painters, plasterers, glaziers) were also referred to by one or another of these terms.

One study of Caversham, New Zealand at the turn of the century notes that a skilled trade was considered a trade that required an apprenticeship to entry. Skilled tradesmen worked either in traditional handicraft workshops or newer factories that emerged during the Industrial Revolution. Traditional handicraft roles included, for example: "sail-maker, candle-maker, cooper, japanner, lapidary and taxidermist, canister-maker, furrier, cap-maker, dobbin-maker, french-polisher, baker, miller, brewer, confectioner, watch-maker, tinsmith, glazier, maltster, wood-turner, saddler, shipwright, scale-maker, engraver and cutler."

Modern use and list of skilled trades
Tradesmen are contrasted with laborers, agricultural workers, and professionals (those in the learned professions). Skilled tradesmen are distinguished:
 from laborers such as bus drivers, truck drivers, cleaning laborers, and landscapers in that the laborers "rely heavily on physical exertion" while those in the skilled trades rely on and are known for "specific knowledge, skills, and abilities." Both types of work, however, are considered blue-collar. 
 from professionals in that the professionals require more education and have a higher duty of care and routinely make decisions "on the basis of expertise and ability in complex situations where there may be no, or little, previous history."

There is no definitive list of modern skilled trades, as definitions vary, with some lists being broader than others.

Earnings and social standing
A British study found that, after taking student loan repayments into account, a higher apprenticeship (at level 5 in the national qualifications frameworks) delivered higher lifetime median earnings than a degree from a university outside the Russell Group. Despite this, polling for the report found that apprenticeships have a lower perceived value than bachelor's degrees.

Data from the United States shows that vocational education can provide a respectable income at a lesser cost in time and money for training. Even ten years after graduation, there are many people with a certificate or associate degree who earn more money than those with a B.A.

The average taxable income for the top trades in Australia can be up to $100,000, while the average for all Australians is $85,800.

See also

 Artisan
 Grey-collar worker
 Guild
 Journeyman
 List of construction trades
 Master craftsman
 Renovation
 Skilled worker
 Trade union
 Technician
 Vocational education

References

Artisans
Skilled tradespeople

no:Handverker